The 1896 United States presidential election in Missouri took place on November 3, 1896. All contemporary 45 states were part of the 1896 United States presidential election. Voters chose 17 electors to the Electoral College, which selected the president and vice president.

Missouri was won by the Democratic nominees, former U.S. Representative William Jennings Bryan of Nebraska and his running mate Arthur Sewall of Maine. Four electors cast their vice presidential ballots for Thomas E. Watson. Unlike in the more easterly border states, Bryan's "free silver" platform had very substantial appeal in the Unionist but highly populist Ozark "Bible Belt". This was seen in that Missouri had in Richard P. Bland that earliest advocate of that monetary policy in Congress, and that only one vote had been cast in 1893 in Missouri against free silver, and that in St. Louis. Although all but one of Missouri's pro-silver members had reversed course by the time of the presidential election, the state was still hit much more than the Old Northwest and upper Mississippi Valley by farmers' debts from falling prices and crop failures since 1887. Despite opposition by the St. Louis Globe-Democrat to Bryan's free silver policies, Bryan gained strongly via capture of James B. Weaver's support base from the 1892 and 1880 elections in the strongly Baptist southwest, which was enough to counter Catholic defections from Grover Cleveland in St. Louis and surrounds.

This is the only election where Douglas County voted for a Democratic presidential candidate. Bryan was also the first Democrat since James Buchanan in 1856 to carry Dade, Dallas, Jasper, Lawrence, Polk and Wright Counties.

Results

Results by county

See also
 United States presidential elections in Missouri

Notes

References

Missouri
1896
1896 Missouri elections